Lubstynek  is a village in the administrative district of Gmina Lubawa, within Iława County, Warmian-Masurian Voivodeship, in northern Poland.

The village was ceded to Poland after the East Prussian plebiscite in 1920.

References

Lubstynek